Parborlasia corrugatus is a proboscis worm in the family Cerebratulidae. This scavenger and predator is widely distributed in cold southern oceans.

Description

Parborlasia corrugatus is smooth and flat. Their colouration is variable, ranging from cream through various tones of black. This worm has a wedge-shaped head containing a cavity filled with fluid. It uses this to fire an adhesive, barbed proboscis as a means of defense, and to capture prey. This organ has adhesive secretion to aid in securing its meal.

Although this creature does not have a dedicated respiratory system, Parborlasia corrugata is able to obtain oxygen by absorbing it through its skin. An animal of its size would typically find it difficult to receive enough oxygen this way, but this worm has a low metabolic rate, and also enjoys the advantage of its environment, which is cold, oxygen-rich Antarctic waters. When Parborlasia corrugata experiences lower levels of oxygen in the water, it flattens and elongates its body to aid in the uptake of oxygen by increasing its skin area. This manoeuvre also reduces the distance that the oxygen must travel to diffuse into its body.

Potential predators avoid this species as it has a chemical defense: acidic mucus with a pH 3.5.

Distribution

It is found throughout the following areas:
Antarctica
Antarctic Peninsula
south Atlantic Ocean
South Shetland Islands
South Orkney Islands
South Sandwich Islands
South Georgia Island
Bouvet Island
Kerguelen Island
Cargados Carajos Shoals in the Indian Ocean
Falkland Islands
Tierra del Fuego
southern Argentina
Peru
Chile

Densities range greatly from 0.3 m−2 recorded in McMurdo Sound, to the substantially higher density of 26.2 m−2 around Signy Island.

Reproduction
This dioecious species broadcast spawns. The resulting pilidium larvae survive in the water column for up to 150 days.

Diet
Parborlasia corrugatus is both a scavenger and a predator, and feeds upon detritus diatoms, gastropods, amphipods, isopods, various vertebrate carrion, sponges (including Homaxinella balfourensis), jellyfish, seastars, molluscs, anemones, and polychaete worms.

References

Further reading
Clarke, A.; Johnston, N.M. (2003). Antarctic marine benthic diversity. Oceanogr. Mar. Biol. Annu. Rev. 41: 47–114
Biology of the Antarctic Seas XIV, Antarctic Research Series 39(4):289–316, 1983
Science 245:1484–1486, 1989
Ecological Monographs 44(1):105–128, 1974
Journal of Experimental Marine Biology and Ecology 153(1):15–25, 1991
Antarctic Science 10(4):369–375, 1998
Polar Biology 25(3):238–240, 2002
Polar Biology 29(2):106–113, 2006
Clarke A, Prothero-Thomas E (1997) The influence of feeding on oxygen consumption and nitrogen excretion in the Antarctic nemertean Parborlasia corrugatus. Physiological Zoology, 70, 639–649.
Gibson R (1983) Antarctic nemerteans: the anatomy, distribution, and biology of Parborlasia corrugatus (McIntosh, 1876) (Heter-onemertea, Lineidae). Biology of the Antarctic seas. XIV. Antarctic Research Series, 39, 289–316.
Heine JN, McClintock JB, Slattery M, Weston J (1991) Energetic composition, biomass, and chemical defense in the common Antarctic nemertean Parborlasia corrugatus McIntosh. Journal of Experimental Marine Biology and Ecology, 153, 15–25.
Peck LS (1993) Larval development in the Antarctic nemertean Parbolasia corrugatus (Heteronemertea, Lineidae). Marine Biology, 116, 301–310.
Rogers AD, Clarke A, Peck LS (1998) Population genetics of the Antarctic heteronemertean Parbolasia corrugatus from the South Orkney Islands. Marine Biology, 131, 1–13.

External links

Images of Parborlasia corrugatus at Encyclopedia of Life
Images of Parborlasia corrugatus at WoRMS

Lineidae
Marine animals
Antarctic realm fauna
Fauna of the Atlantic Ocean
Fauna of the Indian Ocean
Fauna of the Pacific Ocean
Fauna of the Southern Ocean
Animals described in 1876